Irina Lankova (born September 11, 1977, in Michurinsk, Russia) is a Belgian concert pianist.

Education 
Irina Lankova is graduated with highest honours from Gnessin State Musical College in Moscow and from Royal Conservatory of Brussels. She studied with great pianists of Russian School such as Evgeny Moguilevsky (himself a pupil of Heinrich Neuhaus), Irina Temchenko, Vladimir Ashkenazy, and others.

Professional career 
Irina Lankova performs on prestigious stages all over the world such as Carnegie Hall in New York, Wigmore Hall in London, Het Concertgebouw in Amsterdam, Salle Gaveau in Paris, Flagey in Brussels, Cidades das Artes in Rio and many others. She is invited to play in many international festivals: Piano Folies Touquet, Académie d'Eté de Nice, Sagra Musicale Umbria, Schiermonnikoog Kamermuziekefestival, Festival de Wallonie, Brussels Summer Festival, Fortissimo d'Orleans, Berlin Summer Festival, etc.

Her performances are critically acclaimed for her expressive and poetic interpretations, colorful palette, and rich tone. International critics describe Irina Lankova as a pianist with "genuinely poetic touch" and "infinite palette of colours". After her successful Wigmore Hall debut in 2008, Irina Lankova was invited to join the worldwide piano elite "Steinway Artists". 

Her signature way of presenting her recitals with short introductions attracts a wide audience  "Along with her deep and emotional interpretations, she gives short introductions to the music... and creates something less conventional where everyone feels welcomed", International Piano Magazine.

Her albums dedicated to Rachmaninoff, Scriabin, Chopin and Schubert are highly acclaimed by critics for their "great sensitivity" (Pianiste), "very personal narrative" (La Libre Belgique) and "compelling authority" (The Independent). In March 2021, she released her latest album "Elégie" featuring her favorite pieces by Rachmaninov, Schubert, and Bach. 

Inspired by other forms of art and always in search of new ways of presenting classical music, Irina Lankova develops innovative creative projects. After many years of working on Goldberg Variations of Bach, she created in 2020 a multimedia project "Goldberg Visions" together with French visual artist Isabelle Françaix, combining music and video.

The artist's YouTube channel counts several million views  and includes many videos from concerts, home recordings and 'Piano Unveiled' series. 

Since 2015, she is the artistic director of International Max Festival in Belgium.

Private life 
Irina Lankova is married to a Belgian architect and has two children. She lives in Belgium (Walloon Brabant).

Discography 
 Sergei Rachmaninov, Franz Liszt (2004, CD): Rachmaninov Preludes Op. 23, Liszt Rapsodie No. 2 with cadence by Rachmaninov
 Alexander Scriabin (2006, CD): Sonates No. 2 & No. 9, Pieces Op. 32, Op. 57
 Frédéric Chopin (2008, CD): Sonata No. 3, Ballade No. 1, Scherzo No. 2, Nocturnes
 Franz Schubert (2013, CD Indésens): Drei Klavierstücke D. 946, Piano Sonata D. 959, Impromptu D. 899 No. 3
 "Caprice" (2015, CD Indésens): with violinist Tatiana Samouil
 "Goldberg Visions" (2020, CD): Johann Sebastian Bach Goldberg Variations
 "Elégie" (2021, CD): Rachmaninov, Schubert and Bach

External links 
 Official Website of Irina Lankova
 Irina Lankova on YouTube
 Irina Lankova on Facebook
 Irina Lankova on Instagram

1977 births
Belgian pianists
Belgian women pianists
Living people
Musicians from Moscow
21st-century pianists
Women classical pianists
21st-century women pianists